The Lake Mountain Lookout Complex is a 49-foot tall lookout tower erected in 1926 approximately 20 miles east of Lakeside, Arizona. It overlooks a portion of the Apache-Sitgreaves National Forest. The lookout was staffed by a forest ranger who was stationed at the nearby Los Burros Ranger Station, from which they would ride out to the lookout each day. The tower was constructed atop Lake Mountain, at the 8250 foot elevation, by the Aermotor Windmill Company.

See also
 
 
 National Register of Historic Places listings in Apache County, Arizona

References

Fire lookout towers on the National Register of Historic Places in Arizona
National Register of Historic Places in Apache County, Arizona
Historic sites in Arizona
Buildings and structures in Apache County, Arizona
1926 establishments in Arizona
Towers completed in 1926